Morpho eugenia, the Eugene morpho, is a Neotropical butterfly found in French Guiana.

The name honours Empress Eugénie, the empress consort, as the wife of Napoleon III.

The male resembles the generally known Morpho aega, but the blue is duller and lighter. Forewing also above with the two white costal spots and with less black at the apex.

References
 Le Moult (E.) & Réal (P.), 1962-1963. Les Morpho d'Amérique du Sud et Centrale, Editions du cabinet entomologique E. Le Moult, Paris.
 "Morpho Fabricius, 1807" at Markku Savela's Lepidoptera and Some Other Life Forms

Butterflies described in 1860
Morpho
Nymphalidae of South America